The 2017 Atlantic Coast Conference baseball tournament was held from May 23 through 28 at Louisville Slugger Field in Louisville, Kentucky.  The annual tournament determines the conference champion of the Division I Atlantic Coast Conference for college baseball.  The tournament champion receives the league's automatic bid to the 2017 NCAA Division I baseball tournament.  This was the last of 19 athletic championship events held by the conference in the 2016–17 academic year.

On September 14, 2016, the ACC announced that the 2017 tournament originally slated to be played in Durham, North Carolina, along with neutral site championships for seven other sports, would be moved out of the state of North Carolina due to the controversial NC House Bill 2. On October 4, 2016, it was announced that Louisville Slugger Field in Louisville, Kentucky, would be the new host venue for 2017.

Florida State defeated North Carolina in the championship game to win the tournament for the seventh time overall, and the second time in three seasons.

Format and seeding
The tournament format, along with the number of eligible teams, was changed for the 2017 tournament.  The winner of each seven team division and the top ten other teams based on conference winning percentage, regardless of division, from the conference's regular season will be seeded one through twelve.  Seeds one and two are awarded to the two division winners.  Teams are then divided into four pools of three teams each, with the winners advancing to a single-elimination bracket for the championship. On May 24, due to inclement weather, the schedule for the tournament was altered.  Additionally, Jim Paterson Stadium on the University of Louisville campus was added as a site.

Schedule and results

Schedule

Pool Play

Pool A

Pool B

Pool C

Pool D

Elimination round

Championship game

All-Tournament Team

‡ - Tournament MVP

References

2017 Atlantic Coast Conference baseball season
Atlantic Coast Conference baseball tournament
Atlantic Coast Conference baseball tournament
Atlantic Coast Conference baseball tournament
Baseball competitions in Kentucky
College sports tournaments in Kentucky
Sports competitions in Louisville, Kentucky